The Indiana Pacers are an American professional basketball team based in Indianapolis, Indiana. The Pacers play in the Central Division of the Eastern Conference in the National Basketball Association (NBA). The team began playing in 1967 as a charter member of the American Basketball Association (ABA), and joined the NBA as part of the ABA-NBA merger. The team has played their home games at the Gainbridge Fieldhouse since the 1999–2000 NBA season. The Pacers are owned by Herbert and Melvin Simon, and David Morway is their general manager. Nate Bjorkgren was the team's head coach in 2020-2021 and was fired after one season. Rick Carlisle was hired to replaced Bjorkgren, becoming the coach of the Pacers for the second time. 

There have been 14 head coaches for the Pacers franchise. The franchise's first head coach was Larry Staverman, who coached for two seasons. Bobby Leonard is the franchise's all-time leader for the most regular season games coached (985), the most regular season game wins (529), the most playoff games coached (116), and the most playoff game wins (69). Leonard is also the only coach to win an ABA championship with the Pacers, with 3 (1970, 1972, 1973). Larry Bird, who coached three seasons with the Pacers, is the Pacers' all-time leader for the highest winning percentage with .687. Bird is also the only coach to win an NBA Eastern Conference championship with the Pacers, but lost the 2000 NBA Finals against the Los Angeles Lakers. Mel Daniels is the only Pacers coach to have coached less than one season. Jack Ramsay, Larry Brown, and Bobby Leonard are the only Pacers' coaches to be elected into the Basketball Hall of Fame as a coach. Ramsay was also named one of the top 10 coaches in NBA history. Dick Versace and Bird have spent their entire NBA coaching careers with the Pacers. Frank Vogel was named interim head coach after Jim O'Brien was fired midway through the 2010–11 season.

Key

Coaches

Notes
 A running total of the number of coaches of the Pacers. Thus, any coach who has two or more separate terms as head coach is only counted once.
 Each year is linked to an article about that particular NBA season, except for the seasons spent in the ABA.

References
General

Specific

Lists of National Basketball Association head coaches by team

Head coaches